The Flood Risk Reduction Program, though authorized, was not implemented. The 1996 farm bill (P.L. 104-127) authorized that contract acreage subject to frequent flooding receive up to 95% of transition payments and projected crop insurance payments in lieu of market transition payments. In return, producers would have complied with swampbuster and conservation compliance provisions and forgone future conservation program payments and disaster payments.

References

United States Department of Agriculture programs